These are the summary results by party of the elections to the Provinzialtag ("Provincial Assembly") of East Prussia during the Weimar Republic (1918–1933).

1921

1925

1929

1933

Sources
 Wahlen-in-Deutschland:  Weimarer Republik 1918-1933 - Preußische Provinziallandtage - Provinz Ostpreußen  

Elections in the Weimar Republic
East Prussia
East Prussia
East Prussia
East Prussia
East Prussia